

Mullinger Swamp Conservation Park is a protected area in the Australian state of South Australia located in the state's south-east in the gazetted locality of Kybybolite on the border with the state of Victoria about  north-east of Naracoorte.

The conservation park occupies land in section 681 of the cadastral unit of the Hundred of Binnum which was proclaimed on 15 January 1976 under the National Parks and Wildlife Act 1972. Prior to proclamation, the land was “vacant Crown Land” which may have been used for grazing.

The conservation park occupies about 35% of the extent of the Mullinger Swamp with the remainder being located in Victoria and which received protected area status as the Mullinger Swamp Wildlife Reserve in 1983.

In 1992, the conservation park was described as having soils that were “alkaline, poorly drained, deep, grey, self-mulching, cracking clay” while the land surrounding the swamp had “alkaline. imperfectly drained, hard, apedal. mottled-yellow, duplex soils.” The latter supported “a river red gum open forest with a disturbed understorey of wallaby grass (Danthonia sp.), introduced grasses and pasture weeds such as Cape weed (Arctotheca calendula).”

As of 1992, the conservation park was used by “local and district residents” for “picnics, fishing and swimming” and “on occasions by field naturalists and birdwatchers.” However, its attraction as a swimming site has declined due to the establishment of a swimming lake in Naracoorte.

The conservation park is classified as an IUCN Category IV protected area. In 1980, it was listed on the now-defunct Register of the National Estate.

See also
Protected areas of South Australia

References

External links
Entry for Mullinger Swamp Conservation Park on the Protected Planet website

Conservation parks of South Australia
Protected areas established in 1976
1976 establishments in Australia
Limestone Coast
South Australian places listed on the defunct Register of the National Estate